The Australasian Society for Classical Studies (ASCS) is an international organisation which aims to promote the advancement of the study of ancient Greece and Rome, and their related fields. The organisation was established in 1966. The current senior executive team includes Associate Professors Anne Mackay (President), Kathryn Welch (Secretary) and Tom Stevenson (Vice-President), and Dr Alison Griffith (Vice-President), and Mr William Dolley (Treasurer).

Antichthon 
ASCS has published the peer-reviewed academic journal, Antichthon, annually since 1967. The current editors are professors Han Baltussen and Arthur Pomeroy. The journal focuses on Greece and Rome, but also accepts research on the Ancient Near East and the Mediterranean from the beginnings of civilisation to the Early Middle Ages. Antichthon offers articles on topics relating to the languages, literature, thought, history and archaeology of the ancient world.

Annual Conference 
ASCS holds an annual conference for both academics and postgraduate students in Classical Studies, Ancient History, Latin and Greek. The 2017 conference is the thirty-eighth conference held by ASCS. In the past, the conference has attracted as many as 160 attendees and 140 presenters.

References

External links 
 Official Website

Ancient Roman studies